Joseph Coincé (1764–1833) was a French Jesuit and physician.

1764 births
1833 deaths
19th-century French physicians
Clergy from Metz
19th-century French Jesuits
Physicians from Metz